Richard Boyer may refer to:
Richard Boyer (broadcaster) (1891–1961), Australian broadcaster
Richard O. Boyer (1903–1973), American journalist
Rick Boyer (1943–2021), American author
Richard Delmer Boyer (born 1958), American convicted murderer